Many a New Day: Karrin Allyson Sings Rodgers & Hammerstein is an album by Karrin Allyson recorded in tribute to the songwriting partnership of Richard Rodgers and Oscar Hammerstein II. It earned Allyson a Grammy Award nomination for Best Jazz Vocal Album. Many a New Day peaked at 13 on the Billboard Jazz albums chart.

Reception
Christopher Loudon reviewed Many a New Day for the Jazz Times in October 2015 and wrote, "At last, the Hammerstein portion of the Rodgers canon is getting serious, full-length appreciation...There's no room on this album for splashy solos or virtuosic grandstanding. The focus is squarely on sensitive, intelligent arrangements shaped around Allyson's unique sound—slightly parched and gently tremulous—expressly built to exalt a spectrum of instantly familiar yet largely underappreciated gems. An exquisitely thoughtful trio album, it's also an important one". C. Michael Bailey reviewed the album for AllAboutJazz and gave it 4.5 stars out of 5.

Track listing

Musicians
Karrin Allyson – Vocals
Kenny Barron – Piano
John Patitucci – Double Bass

Production
Karrin Allyson – Producer, Arranger
Michael Leonhart – Producer
Associate Producer – Bill McGlaughlin
Jana Herzen – Executive Producer
Katherine Miller – Recording Engineer, Mixer
Grant Valentine – Assistant Engineer
Robin Tomchin – Project Management
Rachel Silton – Project Management
Seth Cohen – Publicity
Cynthia Herbst – Artist Management
Ingrid Hertfelder – Photography
Stephany Perez – Make Up & Hair
Karen Perez – Stylist
Rebecca Meek – Graphic Design

Track information and credits adapted  from the album's liner notes.

References

2015 albums
Karrin Allyson albums
Motéma Music albums
Richard Rodgers tribute albums
Rodgers and Hammerstein